Judge Quarles may refer to:

Joseph V. Quarles (1843–1911), judge of the United States District Court for the Eastern District of Wisconsin
William D. Quarles Jr. (born 1948), judge of the United States District Court for the District of Maryland